Markus Neteler is a software engineer and businessman.

Biography 
He received his degree in physical geography and landscape ecology from Leibniz University Hannover, Germany, in 1999 where he worked as a researcher and teaching assistant for two years.

From 2001 to 2007, he was a researcher at Bruno Kessler Foundation (FBK) (formerly ITC-irst) in Trento, Italy. In the period 2005-2007, while still a FBK researcher, he worked for the Centro di Ecologia Alpina of Trento . From 2008 to 2016, he worked at the Edmund Mach Foundation (FEM) - San Michele all'Adige in Trento as the co-ordinator of the GIS and remote sensing unit. In 2016, he moved to Bonn, Germany, where he co-founded the Mundialis company.

His main interests are remote sensing for environmental risk assessment and free software GIS development, especially GRASS GIS (of which he has been the co-ordinator since 1999).

He is a founding member of the GRASS Anwender-Vereinigung e.V. (Germany), the Open Source Geospatial Foundation (OSGeo, USA) and GFOSS.it the Italian association for geospatial free and open source software. In September 2006, he was honored with the Sol Katz award for Geospatial Free and Open Source Software (GFOSS) for his commitment to the GRASS project coordination. In 2010, he received his PhD in natural sciences (Dr. rer. nat.) in physical geography.

Publications
He co-authored two books on the use of the free and open source software GRASS GIS and several scientific papers on GIS.

</ref>

See also
OSGeo
Sol Katz

References

External links
 Recordings of Markus Neteler at FOSS4G-Conferences in the AV-Portal of German National Library of Science and Technology

Sources

Free software programmers
People in information technology
Living people
1969 births